The Castellers de la Vila de Gràcia, created in 1996, are a colla castellera, based in Vila de Gràcia that makes human castles. They made their first public presentation in 1997 supported by the groups Castellers de Terrassa, the Castellers de Sants and the Castellers de Sant Andreu de la Barca. The colour of their shirts is navy blue.

The first 4 de 8 ( a human castle 8 stories high with  4 people in each level) unloaded by the Castellers de Gràcia (to unload a castle means to start and finish the castle without falling ) was achieved on August 17, 2003 in the Plaça de la Vila de Gracia.

Their best performance, done on October 24, 2014 in Barcelona is 3 de 9 amb folre, 4 de 9 amb folre, 3 de 8 amb agulla and Pilar de 7 amb folre.

Up to the year 2015, the Castellers de la Vila de Gràcia participated seven times in the Castle-making contest, which is celebrated every two years in Tarragona: in 2002, 2004, 2006, 2008, 2010, 2012 and 2014. Their best performance was in 2014, when they finished 5th over 41 participants.

They are commonly known as "The Blue Gang", because of the colour of their shirts or "The Student Gang" because of the young age of most of their members.

Castellers de la Vila de Gràcia appear briefly in the movie L'auberge espagnole by Cédric Klapisch.

History
Castle making is nothing new in Gràcia, and there are historical references which date this tradition back to the last quarter of the 19th century until the first thirty years of the 20th century. Around 1890, a "colla" was created by immigrant peasants who had left Tarragona because of the phylloxera, and was called Xiquets de Gràcia.  Possibly, these new Gracia neighbours found in the Vila de Gràcia, which by then was still a small town, the ideal atmosphere to make human castles and become a local "colla".  It is known and documented that this "colla" began its activities at least since the 1880s until the year 1900, 1910 and in the second decade of the 20th century.  Most performances were executed during the Festa Major de Gràcia.

The beginnings
The story of the  Castellers de la Vila de Gràcia begins in the early 1990s, when a group of youngsters related to the network of neighbourhood associations in Gràcia began to talk about the possibility of founding a Castle making colla in the neighbourhood. This idea began to take shape when they decided to celebrate their first meeting in October 1996, and news began to spread that there was a "colla castellera" in the making. The first rehearsal was on November 23 of that same year at the Plaça del Sol, and it gathered around thirty people.

The first public performance of the new colla was in February 1997,  on occasion of the Diada Castellera de Santa Eulàlia on Placa de Sant Jaume de Barcelona, where they constructed two pillars of 4 ( One person per story, 4 stories;  this is considered as the most simple construction of the whole repertoire) The first performance in  Plaça de la Vila de Gràcia, which is considered as the colla's square, was delivered on March 4, 1997. This actuation gathered around sixty castellers, who unloaded several basic constructions.

The first castles
The official introduction of the new colla into the casteller world was on May 4, 1997, sponsored by the Castellers de Terrasa, the Castellers de Sants and the Castellers de Sant Andreu de la Barca, the Catellers de la Vila de Gràcia unloaded their first six story high castles. This first season had its ups and downs, although the efforts made throughout the year finally bore fruit with the achievement of a seven stories high castle, the 4 de 7, unloaded in order to celebrate their anniversary on November 23.

The transition from castles of 7 to castles of 8
Throughout the following years, the Colla de Gràcia evolved and became a colla de 7 until  October 6, 2002,  when during the XIX Tarragona castle making contest, they achieved their first 4 de 8 after unloading their first 2 de 7 on the previous round.  Ever since that year, the Castellers de la Vila de Gràcia have unloaded a 4 de 8 every year, and have started to gain their place as a colla de 8 and as one of the best 15-20 "colles" of the current casteller world.

Since their first months of existence, the Colla of Gràcia has had its own team of grallers, which has evolved into a learning center for all of those interested in learning  how to play the gralla (a traditional Catalan oboe) in the different activities held by the castellers.

On 1999, the Castellers de la Vida de Gràcia received the Barcelona's Honour Medal, and they are also members of the Colles de Cultura Popular de Gràcia.

Rehearsals
The Castellers de la Vila de Gràcia have rehearsed in different spots in the neighbourhood, among which we can mention  l´Escola Josep Maria Jujol, L´Artesá de Gràcia and the Antiga Escola OSI and in the Escola Reina Escola Reina  School, were they rehearsed for 10 years (from 2002 to 2012). Since 2012 they have their own training place, Espai Cultural Albert Musons.

Other activities
Since the year 1998, the Castellers de la Vila de Gràcia broadcast the casteller radio program "Tercos amunt!" on Ràdio Gràcia. This radio program is still being broadcast currently.  On 2010 "Tercos amunt!" received the Premi Vila de Gràcia to the best communication initiative.

Until the year 2004, they published a magazine called "L´espadat"  which came out every three months.

But the most important extracurricular activity taken on by the castellers de la Vila de Gràcia, is the ornamentation of the Plaça de la Vila for the festivities of la Festa Major de Gràcia since the year 2001.

Participation in the tarragona casteller contest
The Castellers de la Vila de Gràcia have participated on seven occasions in the Tarragona Casteller Contest.  Below are all the contests where the Colla has participated, the castles unloaded and, between parenthesis and in bold lettering, the final position on the ranking.

 XIX Tarragona castell contest (2002): 2 de 7, 4 de 8c, 5 de 7 (13)
 XX Tarragona castell contest (2004): 4 de 8i, 4 d 8c, 5 de 7, 4 de 7a (14)
 XXI Tarragona castell contest (2006): 2 de 7c, 4 de 8c (16)
 XXII Tarragona castell contest (2008): 5 de 7, 4 de 8c, 4 de 7a (15)
 XXIII Tarragona castell contest (2010): 4 de 8, 2 de 7, 5 de 7 (11)
 XXIV Tarragona castell contest (2012): 4de8, 3de9f (id), 3de9f (id),3de8, 2de7 (15)
 XXV Tarragona castell contest (2014): 4de9f, 3de9f, 4d8a (5)

The Castellers de la Vila de Gràcia in the world
Performances held outside the Països Catalans
Marseille (2001)
Carcassonne (2002)
Sevilla (2005)
Montreal (2015)

Performances held within the Països Catalans (outside Catalonia)
 País Valencià
 Algemesí (2003)
 La Xara (Dénia) (2007)
 L'Alcúdia (2009)
Northern Catalonia
 Baó (1998) (1999)
 Perpinyà (2005)
Balearic Islands
 Sant Francesc de Formentera, Formentera (2010)
 Eivissa, Eivissa (2010)

The cap de colla
The Cap de Colla is the highest technical responsible of the colles castelleres.

Presidents

First castles unloaded

Specified bibliography
 Albert Musons, Quim Perelló, Jordi Ràfols i Miquel Sendra: Xiquets ahir, castellers per sempre: Vila de Gràcia (1876–2002), Col·lecció "La Font de l'atzavara" del Taller d'Història de Gràcia, 111 pages., Barcelona.
 Carles Gallardo: Blau, fraternitat i castells: Castellers de la Vila de Gràcia (1997–2001), 126 pages, Published by the  Castellers de la Vila de Gràcia.

References

External links
 Castellers de la Vila de Gràcia 
 Here you can find the chronicles of all actuations of the colla 

Castellers
Gràcia